Xylota auronitens is a species of hoverfly in the family Syrphidae.

Distribution
India.

References

Eristalinae
Insects described in 1908
Taxa named by Enrico Adelelmo Brunetti
Diptera of Asia